I Don't Want to Hurt You may refer to:

"I Don't Want to Hurt You", single by Frank Black from The Cult of Ray 1996
"I Don't Want to Hurt You", single by Last Autumn's Dream
"I Don't Want to Hurt You", single by King Sounds and The Israelites 
"I Don't Want to Hurt You", song by Robbie Williams from The Heavy Entertainment Show 2016